Isaak Löw Hofmann, Edler von Hofmannsthal (10 June 1759 – 12 December 1849) was an Austrian merchant.

Early life
Hofmann was born on 10 June 1759 in Prostiboř (in what is today known as the Czech Republic).

During the famine in Ansbach in the middle of the 18th century, Hofmann's parents had emigrated from Pretzendorf (now Himmelkron), near Bayreuth, to Bohemia, where they lived in very poor circumstances. His early training he received at home, and from his thirteenth year he studied at Prague as a "bachur" (Talmudic scholar) under Rabbi Abraham Plohn.

Career
After completing his studies he entered as teacher the house of Joel Baruch, a tobacco farmer for the Austrian government. Besides giving instruction to the children, Hofmann took charge of the books of his employer. When in 1788 Baruch moved to Vienna and opened a wholesale house there, Hofmann was appointed manager of the entire business. Having received the same year a permit from the Austrian government to do business in Vienna, he chose the name "Isaak Löw Hofmann". On the death of Baruch he was made a partner and, in 1794, became sole member of the firm which bore the name "Hofmann und Löwinger". Becoming interested in 1796 in the manufacture of silk, he was one of the first to farm the silk monopoly from the Hungarian government (1802), a privilege which his house retained for nearly half a century. At his instigation, his son Emanuel wrote a pamphlet, "Einleitung zur Seidenzucht", of which more than 16,000 copies were distributed. Hofmann was very active in business, and succeeded in making his firm one of the leading houses of Austria-Hungary.

Hofmann took great interest in the Jewish community of Vienna, being president in 1806 and representative in 1812, which latter office he held until his death. In 1822 he founded the institution for the poor ("Armenanstalt"), which is still flourishing. He received many honours, and was made a member of the hereditary nobility by the Emperor of Austria in 1835.

Personal life

Hofmann was married to Therese Schefteles (1773–1850), a daughter of Wolf Beer Schefteles. Together, they were the parents of:

 Henriette Hofmann (1791–1830), who married Lazar Goldstein.
 Regine Babette Hofmann (1792–1812), who married Ephraim Hürsch.
 Josephine Pepi Hofmann (1795–1819), who died unmarried.
 Emanuel Hofmann von Hofmannsthal (1800–1883), who married Rebekka Kaulla, a daughter of Wolf von Kaulla.
 Josef Edler von Hofmannsthal (1802–1872)
 Sigmund Edler von Hofmannsthal (1805–1883), who married Franziska Dormize, a daughter of Leopold Löw Dormitzer.
 Ignaz Hofmann von Hofmannsthal (1807–1876), who married Wilhelmine Herz-Lämel, a daughter of Heinrich Eduard Herz.
 Elise von Hofmannsthal (1807–1876), who married Solly Herz, brother to Adelheid Herz (who married Carl Mayer von Rothschild).
 Augustin Emil Hofmann von Hofmannsthal (1815–1881), who married Petronilla Ordioni-Rhò, a daughter of Anton Maria Rhò.
 Ernestine von Hofmannsthal (d. 1870), who married Leopold Lang.
 Bernhard von Hofmannsthal, a banker who married Caroline Lang, a daughter of Jacob Lang.

Edler von Hofmannsthal died on 12 December 1849 in Vienna.

Descendants
He was the great-grandfather of the well-known Austrian novelist, librettist, and dramatist Hugo von Hofmannsthal (1874–1929).

See also
 Hofmannsthal

References 

1759 births
1849 deaths
Isaak
People from Tachov District
Czech Jews
German Bohemian people
Austrian industrialists
Edlers of Austria
Jews and Judaism in Vienna
Austro-Hungarian Jews
Austrian expatriates in Hungary